Chata Kalikapur is a census town within the jurisdiction of the Maheshtala police station in the Thakurpukur Maheshtala CD block in the Alipore Sadar subdivision of the South 24 Parganas district in the Indian state of West Bengal.

Geography

Area overview
Alipore Sadar subdivision is the most urbanized part of the South 24 Parganas district. 59.85% of the population lives in the urban areas and 40.15% lives in the rural areas. In the northern portion of the subdivision (shown in the map alongside) there are 21 census towns. The entire district is situated in the Ganges Delta and the subdivision, on the east bank of the Hooghly River, is an alluvial stretch, with industrial development.

Note: The map alongside presents some of the notable locations in the subdivision. All places marked in the map are linked in the larger full screen map.

Location

Rameswarpur, Chata Kalikapur, Ganye Gangadharpur and Asuti  form a cluster of census towns on the southern side of Maheshtala, as per the map of the Thakurpukur Maheshtala CD block on page 153 of the District Census Handbook 2011 for the South 24 Parganas.

Demographics
According to the 2011 Census of India, Chata Kalikapur had a total population of 24,985, of which 12,709 (51%) were males and 12,276 (49%) were females. There were 3,318 persons in the age range of 0 to 6 years. The total number of literate persons was 16,715 (77.15% of the population over 6 years).

According to the 2001 Census of India, Chata Kalikapur had a population of 20,087. Males constitute 51% of the population and females 49%. It has an average literacy rate of 57%, lower than the national average of 59.5%; with male literacy of 63% and female literacy of 52%. 15% of the population is under 6 years of age.

Kolkata Urban Agglomeration
The following municipalities and census towns in the South 24 Parganas district were part of the Kolkata Urban Agglomeration in the 2011 census: Maheshtala (M), Joka (CT), Balarampur (CT), Chata Kalikapur (CT), Budge Budge (M), Nischintapur (CT), Uttar Raypur (CT), Pujali (M) and Rajpur Sonarpur (M).

Infrastructure
According to the District Census Handbook 2011, Chata Kalikapur covered an area of 5.66 km2. Among the civic amenities, it has 30 km of roads with open drains. The source of protected water supply is a borewell tank and overhead tank. It has 2,000 domestic electric connections and 200 road lights. Among the medical facilities are a family welfare centre and a nursing home 3 km away. Among the educational facilities are 14 primary schools, 2 middle schools, 3 secondary schools, 1 senior secondary school and the nearest general degree college is at Maheshtala 6 km away. It has 2 recognised typewriting, shorthand and vocational training centres. Three important commodities manufactured sre: ready-made garments, grill and dyeing. It has a branch of a nationalised bank.

Transport
A short stretch of local roads link Chata Kalikapur to the Budge Budge Trunk Road.

Akra railway station is located nearby.

Education
Chatta Subid Ali Institute is a coeducational institution. It is affiliated with the West Bengal Board of Secondary Education.

Healthcare
Sarsuna Block Primary Health Centre, with 15 beds, at Sarsuna, is the major government medical facility in the Thakurpukur Maheshtala CD block.

References

Cities and towns in South 24 Parganas district
Neighbourhoods in Kolkata
Kolkata Metropolitan Area